The Solution is the fourth studio album by rapper Beanie Sigel. It was released on December 11, 2007. The album features production from Dre & Vidal, Reefa, and The Runners, among others. Guest appearances include Jay-Z, Ozzy Osbourne, R. Kelly, Ghostface Killah, and other notable musicians. the album gained a metacritic score  of 72 out of 100 based on 10 reviews.

Background
The Solution is Sigel's first album after re-signing with Roc-A-Fella Records. After his 2005 album, The B. Coming, he took a one-year hiatus from music and returned to recording in 2006. Speaking on the album Beanie Sigel said :

Music

Guests
R. Kelly is featured on the first single "All the Above", while rapper Styles P is featured on "U Ain't Ready 4 Me". Jay-Z makes an appearance on the track "Gutted", while Diddy, Ghostface Killah, and Peedi Crakk hook up with Beanie on "Shake It For Me". Scarface is also featured on the song "Rain (Bridge)" with R&B artist
Raheem DeVaughn, who also appears on "Prayer". Beanie Sigel jumps into unfamiliar territory by featuring an Ozzy Osbourne sample on the track "The Day" and a James Blunt sample on "Dear Self (Can I Talk To You)".

Production

Production originally included producers like Scott Storch and Sha Money XL, but those tracks were cut  for songs produced by  Eric Hudson and Chad West. Production team Dre & Vidal produce Five of the Thirteen tracks on the album with help from up and coming Dirty Harry and Don Cheegro (Harry and Alex) and The Runners produce the lead single "All the Above". Reefa produces two tracks including "Gutted" featuring Jay-Z. Cool and Dre and Dame Grease each produced one track each. Notably absent from The Solution is primary artist and producer Kanye West.

Track listing

Reception

The Solution received generally positive and exceptional ratings after its release. As CD Universe puts it, Beanie "hit the ground running" with this album. As iTunes' review points out, however, "The Solution displays a lyrical mastermind who nonetheless faces an identity crisis when it comes to marketing himself. The album jumps from radio crossovers (“All of the Above”) to concrete body slams (“U Ain’t Ready for Me”) to party songs (“Shake It For Me”)." The album's message failed to maintain itself to its title, and made various direction changes in its delivery, going between very conflicting topics. But As Chris Gaerig praises, "What Beanie Sigel lacks in sheer marketability he makes up for with a vicious flow and an ingenuity rarely seen from an artist of his caliber." The album's composition and featured vocals comes together to make up for the lack of message and consistency; Tracks like "The Day", "Gutted", and "All the Above" stand out perfectly in the album, while adding an upbeat, surreal sound and inspiring lyrics.

Charts

Weekly charts

Year-end charts

References

Beanie Sigel albums
2007 albums
Albums produced by Cool & Dre
Albums produced by Dame Grease
Albums produced by Dre & Vidal
Albums produced by Eric Hudson
Albums produced by the Runners
Albums produced by Rockwilder
Def Jam Recordings albums
Roc-A-Fella Records albums